Società Sportiva Dilettante Tivoli Calcio 1919 is an Italian football club located in Tivoli, Lazio. It currently plays in the Serie D Girone G. Its colors are blue and dark red.

External links
 Unofficial forum

Football clubs in Italy
Football clubs in Lazio
Tivoli, Lazio
Association football clubs established in 1919
1919 establishments in Italy
Sport in the Metropolitan City of Rome Capital